Dedh Lakh Ka Dulha is an Indian Hindi-language comedy drama film directed by Abhay Pratap Singh. The films stars Akhilendra Mishra, Ishtiyak Khan, Harshita Panwar and Dhruv Chheda.

Cast 
 Akhilendra Mishra
 Abhay Pratap Singh
 Ishtiyak Khan
 Harshita Panwar 
 Dhruv Chheda 
 Ahsan Khan

Synopsis
The story of the film is based upon how a father, played by Akhilendra Mishra finds a groom worth 1.5 Rupee instead of 1.5 Lakh Rupees for his daughter. Later the film revolves around the truth of the groom whether he is worth 1.5 Lakh or not.

Soundtrack 
The Music and background score were composed by Shahjahan Sheikh, the first collaboration with KK Films Creations.

Track list

Filming 
The film is mostly shot in Agra, Uttar Pradesh and Naigaon, Mumbai, Maharashtra.

References

External links 
 
 

2022 films
Indian drama films
Indian comedy films
2020s Hindi-language films